Nothnagel is a German surname. Notable people with the surname include:

Anke Nothnagel (born 1966), East German sprint canoeist
Dominik Nothnagel (born 1994), German footballer
Hermann Nothnagel (1841–1905), German internist
José Sáinz Nothnagel (1907–1984), Spanish politician
Johann Andreas Benjamin Nothnagel (1729-1804) German Jewish painter

German-language surnames